Sammy Forson (born 1984) is a Ghanaian-Zambian media personality, broadcast journalist, DJ , artist manager, Entrepreneur, and Music award judge.

In 2013 he got nominated for ‘Best Music Promoter of the Year‘ category and won at the Ghana DJ Awards for his mid-morning show Lifestyle Cafe on Live 91.9 FM.
Sammy Forson won Radio Mid morning host of the 2012 while working at YFM 107.9. After a 3 year stint, he left EIB Network's, Live 91.9 FM in January 2018 and is currently the host of Joy FM's lunch time show popularly known as IGNITION ; and Over drive;. Sammy hosts The Weekend City show on saturday mornings on Joy 99.7 FM.
In addition, Sammy Forson was the Business Manager for 15 times Ghana Music Awards winner and 2012 BET Awards winner Sarkodie.

Early Childhood 

Sammy Forson was born in Zambia and raised in Ghana by Ghanaian parents, he relocated to Ghana at age sixteen.

Education
He completed his secondary education at the Swedru Secondary School. He then got admission into the Ghana Institute of Journalism, where he obtained Diploma in Radio Broadcasting and Chartered Institute of Marketing (Ghana).

Career Life 

Sammy Forson started his career as a presenter  at Garden City Radio in Kumasi,  he then moved to handled the Citi Drive and Citi Countdown show at Citi FM (97.3) Ghana. At a point in time, he was a co- host to the Upside Down Show. He quit Citi FM (97.3) Ghana and joined YFM in 2009. He left YFM and joined Live 91.9 FM. In January 2018, he joined Joy FM (a station own and run by the media group company Multimedia Group Limited).

Awards and nominations

References

External links
 Official Soundcloud Page at SoundCloud
 Official Instagram Page at Twitter

Living people
Ghanaian journalists
Ghanaian radio presenters
1984 births